The white-striped warbler (Myiothlypis leucophrys) is a species of bird in the family Parulidae.
It is endemic to Brazil.

Its natural habitat is subtropical or tropical moist lowland forests.

References

Birds of Brazil
Myiothlypis
Endemic birds of Brazil
Birds described in 1868
Taxa named by August von Pelzeln
Taxonomy articles created by Polbot